The Energy Exchange Austria (EXAA) is a Central European energy exchange headquartered in Vienna. Currently, the EXAA Market encompasses trading areas in the entire of Austria and Germany.

History
EXAA was founded 2001 and started day-ahead spot market trading of electric energy on March 21, 2002. Since then, EXAA has developed into a major platform for efficient trading that makes use of the possibilities offered by a liberalized energy market in Central Europe. In June 2005, trading started in European CO2 emissions allowances (EUAs) in the market segment for environmental products, which resulted in 2011 into a joint effort with the Greenmarket environmental exchange.

Role of Power Exchanges

Energy exchanges have become an established part of the liberalized energy markets in Europe. They serve as an important supplement to short-term OTC trading and also function as an independent price indicator for electric energy on the wholesale market.

While the energy markets in Central Europe often involve a single electricity producer, or multiple electricity producers that auction their energy in tranches, or via long-term bilateral supply contracts,
an energy exchange contributes to increasing price efficiency and allows electric utilities to react flexibly when facing a changing demand/supply structure. Ultimately, an energy exchange can reduce dramatically the price risk related to short-term spikes in load profiles.

Organization

EXAA was founded as a public limited company and the shareholders are Wiener Börse AG (25.1%) and the APCS AG (34.5%), as well as a number of different companies from the Austrian energy sector holding smaller shares (April 2013).
Since 2005 EXAA forms part of the CISMOgroup, a group comprising a number of different service providers for the energy sector.

The CISMOgroup covers a broad range of specialized services for the electricity markets, such as clearing and settlement of the electricity market, capacity allocation and auctioning, international consulting for projects related to electricity markets,
as well as the regulation and management of feed-in tariffs for green energy in Austria.

Members
As of the April, 2013, more than 70 companies from 14 different countries were trading at the EXAA electricity spot market.

Services

The electricity market – EXAA spot
 EXAA operates a day-ahead electricity spot market, with a single daily auction point at 10:15 AM. Traders place closed buy (bid) and sell (ask) orders for electric energy, to be physically delivered the following day, until 10:12 AM when the orderbook closes. Traders can place bids and asks for electric power in individual hours, as well as in standardized blocks (comprising several hours).

The matching algorithm then evaluates the orders and sets a market clearing price (MCP) for each hour and product to maximize the traded volume. At 10:15 AM all exchange members are notified of their allocations. Orders are evaluated according to specific rules of precedence, where market orders are always fulfilled before block orders and lastly single hour orders. The surplus (non-matched) grey power volume is then offered for sale again at the MCP during a short 3 minute period from 10:16 to 10:19 AM called the post-trading.

In post-trading, the prices for all hours are already known (the MCP being determined during the auction before) and the surplus volumes are sold and bought on a first-come, first-served basis, offering the traders a last-minute opportunity to sell or buy volumes at a known price.

Trading at EXAA takes place 5 days a week, from Monday to Friday, with the volumes for Saturday, Sunday and Monday being traded together on the Friday before. This set-up has its advantages as well as its disadvantages. It is often not possible for utilities to correctly predict their required electricity volumes two days ahead in order to cover their requirements on Friday. Additionally, some trading companies whose main objective is arbitrage (trading for profit without physical procurement or delivery), may miss out on potential trading opportunities that arise over the weekend. On the other hand, a 5-day trading week reflects the reality of smaller utilities that usually cannot or do not want to staff their trading department seven days a week. Another important factor is that even at the big trading floors, the head traders capable of leveraging sudden market developments are usually not present seven days a week. The trading itself is conducted by means of the EXAA online trading system, accessible from any standard internet browser supporting SSL encryption. The security of the system is guaranteed by means of RSA key fobs and the EXAA market operations team that continuously monitors every auction.

Price Volatility

Price volatility on the electricity markets is an important factor in the decision-making process of all involved stakeholders. In general, increased price volatility increases also the risk involved in trading for all parties. Price volatility on the electricity market is influenced mainly by unexpected changes in the supply-demand structure on the markets, which are mainly caused by unpredictable weather patterns (especially due to wind), as well as by unplanned power plant outages.

On the supply side (distribution), the electric utilities are bound to adapt to consumer load profiles, in order to keep the electricity grid balanced. These load-profiles are statistically planned in advance and usually covered by long-term supply contracts, or own production of electric energy. Often however, irregularities in the long-term prognosis occur and the utilities are obliged to procure, or sell the outstanding quantities of electric energy on the market. The irregularities on the demand side are usually determined by the varying consumption of electric power by households and the industry, which depend again mostly on the changing weather conditions.
In the recent years, the European markets have witnessed a steady rise of price volatility that was caused among other factors, by the augmented use of renewable energy sources - which can be explained by the fact that a larger portion of the overall electricity production in Europe depends nowadays on weather, especially wind power plants.

Sources of volatility on the European electricity market
All electricity producing installations have to adhere to their declared schedule (a production plan specifying the volume of their electricity production for every hour of the day). It is the responsibility of the electric utilities that own the power plants to match their production and the consumption. The electricity consumption is calculated from historic data (load profile of the electric consumption in the given area and serves as the lead indicator for the future volumes that will be required to cover the demand. The Electric utility faces a number of options how to procure the necessary volumes of electric energy. If the company owns its own power plants, which is usually the case, it produces a part of the electricity itself. Depending on the production capacity of the company, a major part of the outstanding volume is acquired, or sold via long-term bilateral contracts. The rest can be obtained via the OTC market and the short-term demand is covered via day-ahead, or even intra-day trading. The relative rigidity of the production, which cannot be flexibly adjusted and the relative uncertainty about the actual consumption, which depends on a number of factors such as weather, industrial production levels etc., are bound to create unpredicted spikes in electricity prices.

There is one major factor that had a dramatic influence on the electricity spot prices in the recent years, which is the wind. The portion of the wind energy in the overall electricity production increased significantly in the last couple of years in many European countries due to heavily subsidized governmental programs favoring investments into renewable energy sources. In some countries such as Germany, the wind power installations are required by law to make full use of the prevailing weather conditions and always produce the maximum possible amount of electric energy.
Firstly it has to be stated that the wind is a completely flexible energy source per se, since the head of the wind turbine can be rotated, thereby stopping to turn and to produce electric energy. However, this flexibility is taken away by the prevailing environmental and energy laws in order to maximize the share of renewable energy in the production portfolio to the fullest extent possible.
Secondly, wind is a highly unpredictable factor and the schedules for wind installations are often far off, despite major efforts to statistically predict the short-term wind conditions.
The two above mentioned factors combined introduce a new source of volatility into an already volatile system that gives rise to electricity prices.

While the measures aiming at increasing the electricity production of renewable energy sources can be considered highly effective and successful, they lead to price distortions and exerted increased pressure on the markets, as well as on the electricity grid.

Clearing and Settlement
 In order to start trading at the EXAA, companies can become either a direct clearing member, or employ the services of a broker and become a non-clearing member. Before being accepted as a direct clearing member, companies have to complete the membership procedure and provide a security deposit to back their future transactions. Companies that don’t necessarily require a full membership can nevertheless participate in electricity trading via a broker.

The broker (agent clearing member) provides the necessary collaterals and acquires/sells the required electricity volumes for its clients, in return for a small brokerage fee. In either case, EXAA functions as a central counter-party to every trading transaction, which means that EXAA guarantees the physical fulfillment of every trade.

teem - Training for Energy and Environmental Markets
Besides its function as a marketplace for spot electricity, EXAA also supports regional initiatives related to electricity markets and provides a training program - teem, for electric utilities and different stakeholders from the energy industry.
The Training for Energy and Environmental Markets was developed by EXAA in cooperation with experts from the CISMO Group and from different strategic partners covering all segments of the energy sector. The goal was to develop a training with focus on the practical aspects of the electricity industry, using the newest data to analyze trends and market developments and provide a wide range of professionals with insights from market practitioners. The transparent and coherent energy insights as well as current developments are not only interesting for energy newcomers but also for employees who want to broaden and update their knowledge. 
teem has already achieved the position of market leader in the energy training segment as it convinces delegates with its up-to-date and compact contentcs as well as its great value for money.

Price stiffness
Price stiffness could be considered the "opposite" of the price elasticity function. While the price elasticity is a measure indicating the change of the demand or supply given a certain change in the price, the "price stiffness" used by EXAA is set out to determine the impact of a change in the supply and demand structure on the market clearing price.
The reason behind investigating such a measure is to assess the influence of bids (especially market orders) on the market clearing price (the price for each product calculated during the auction).
Traders are often forced to enter bids as market orders (a bid specifying only the required quantity, not limited by a certain price) in order to have a certainty of being able to procure the necessary volumes to close their positions. Market orders can potentially have a major impact on the outcome of the auction since particularly significant bid/s can cause a dramatic shift in the aggregated demand, or in the aggregated supply curve leading to unwanted price spikes. (Note: While a certain number of significant price spikes is bound to occur due to extreme market conditions, one of the characteristics of a stable market is how well does it absorb single bids and what are the usual levels of volatility on average.) This aspect resents a potential risk in smaller markets, where large market orders might cause a dramatic price shift. The price stiffness analysis is based on a simulation, which replays past auctions, while injecting additional market orders of differing magnitude into the auction, thus obtaining a virtual price for multiple critical scenarios.
A central part of EXAA publications is the Daily Spotlight, which is a brief summary of the recent trends in price and volume development at the EXAA. It is compiled on a daily basis and made publicly available at the EXAA website.

References

External links

EXAA, Energy Exchange Austria official EXAA website

Electric power exchanges in Europe
Electric power distribution
Electricity markets
Electric power in Austria
Electric power in Germany
Electric power in Europe